Metarbela reticulosana is a moth in the family Cossidae described by Embrik Strand in 1913. It is found in Cameroon and Equatorial Guinea.

References

Metarbelinae